Ernst Wüthrich (26 August 1918 – 20 August 1972) was a Swiss racing cyclist. He was the Swiss National Road Race champion in 1945.

References

External links

1918 births
1972 deaths
Swiss male cyclists
Cyclists from Zürich